Payable on Death Live is a live recording of Christian metal band P.O.D. at the TomFest concert on February 18, 1997. It is P.O.D.'s third and final album on Rescue Records. The album was remastered and re-released in 2001 by Rescue Records.

Track listing

 The track "Draw the Line" was written by Tim Gonzalez of the San Diego rapcore group House of Suffering.
 On the original release, "Murder" was track 9. On the re-release, "1-800-HIT-HOME" and "Murder" are both at the end of track 8. "1-800-HIT-HOME" is not actually a song, but a message from Noah Bernardo Sr. (father of Wuv Bernardo and owner of Rescue Records). It has information about believing in and receiving Christ, and about "1-800-HIT-HOME".

References

P.O.D. albums
1997 live albums